Narbal is a tehsil in central Kashmir's Beerwah sub-district. It is also a block in Budgam district in the Indian administered union territory of Jammu and Kashmir.

Geography

As per government records, the block number of Narbal is 14. The block has 51 villages and there are a total of 11,343 homes in this block.. It is also tehsil since 2014.
It is surrounded by Beerwah and Magam tehsils towards the south-west and west, Pattan tehsil towards the North and Srinagar's Shalteng towards the East. Srinagar, Magam and Budgam are the nearby cities or towns. River Sukhnag, which originates in Tosamaidan, passes through the town and is the major source of water in the area.
There is a Sufi Ziyarat of Syed Mohammad Soliah Bukhari R.A near Narbal Main Stop.
Narbal is known for the beautiful playground where people from adjacent areas are seen playing cricket, football, and other sports.

Access
Mazhom railway station is the nearby railway station located six kilometres from Narbal.

Economy

The count of employed people of Narbal block is 24,513, yet 62,953 are un-employed. And out of 24,513 employed people, 3,871 persons are fully reliant on farming. Although a vast majority of population is involved with agricultural activities (rice and vegetable farming) in one way or other, it is not the major source of income in Narbal. People obtain livelihood either from government jobs, daily skilled as well as unskilled labour activities etc. Private sector jobs are rare.

Housing colonies
Mohalla Moulvi Sahib is a housing colony in Narbal. It is named after an Islamic scholar Syed Amir ud din known as Moulvi Sahib in district Budgam. It is located on the left side of Narbal Gulmarg Road.

Other colonies include

Syed Mohalla, Arifeen Colony Sector 1, 2 and 3, New Colony, Alamdaar Colony

References

External links

Cities and towns in Budgam district